Kristin Lodoen or Kristin Lødøen (born 18 April 1966 in Lillehammer) is a Norwegian photographer, visual artist, dancer and choreographer.

Linder studied photography at International Center of Photography, part-time studies, New York, 1997–2002, and dance at Martha Graham School of Contemporary Dance, New York, 1990–1995. She also studied choreography at State University of New York at Purchase  in 1992/93, and dance at Kunsthøgskolen in Oslo, BFA, 1987–90. Kristin Linder has been a dancer in Martha Graham Dance Company, New York, 1997–2001. She is known as a photographer, visual artist, dancer and dancephotographer for several dance companies in New York. Her artistic background gives unique possibilities in regards to communicating movement/dance. This is evident in her work as a visual artist. She has participated in several exhibitions and Festivals in the US and Europe.

Represented

Norwegian Museum of Photography, Norway, 
"TIDE", Nationalmuseum of Art, Norway
"TIDE", Yamagata International Documentary Festival,  database, Japan

Group exhibits
 Biennale Internazionale dell Arte Contemporanea
 Florence Biennale, Italy, w/TIDE, in collaboration with Rolf Aamot, 2007
 International Print Triennial, Vienna, Austria, 2007
 Gallery Loch Camelota, Festival of Light, Kraków, Poland, 2004
 International Center of Photography, Education Gallery, New York, 2004
 Norwegian Museum of Photography, Preus Museum, Participated in exhibit: Rolf Aamot, "A feeling of deep pain", 2003–04
 Fall Exhibition, Bergen Artmuseum, Norway, w/TIDE, in collaboration with Rolf Aamot, 2000
 Short Film Festival, Grimstad, Norway, w/TIDE, in collaboration with Rolf Aamot, 2000
 Bergen International Film Festival, Norway, w/TIDE, in collaboration with Rolf Aamot, 2000

Selected works
 Choreography: ”Irreversible Steps” (1991), ”Searching for a Footprint” (1992), ”Tide”, i samarbeid med billedkunstner og regisør Rolf Aamot

Awards
 UTSNITT 2006, silver in the Category; This Year's Newcomer.

External links
 Kristin Lødøen official website
Rolf Aamot official website

Literature

 Direct Art Magazine, oktober 2005

Norwegian photographers
Norwegian artists
1966 births
Living people
Norwegian women photographers